You Cannot Be Serious! is a British comedy satire show that aired on ITV from 2 June to 7 July 2012 and was hosted by Alistair McGowan.

Premise
The premise of the show is that McGowan mixes the funniest, quirkiest, and silliest clips from the week's televised sport.

External links

2010s British comedy television series
2012 British television series debuts
2012 British television series endings
2010s British television miniseries
ITV comedy
English-language television shows